Edward Palmer (8 March 1842 – 3 May 1899) was an Australian pastoralist (so-called 'Squatter'), public servant and conservative Queensland politician.

Palmer was born in Sydney. He was a member of the Legislative Assembly of Queensland for Burke 1883 to 1888, member for Carpentaria 1888-1893 and Flinders from 1889 to 1896. He was a supporter of Thomas McIlwraith. Palmer is today best known as the author of the frequently cited reminiscences 'Early Days in North Queensland'.

Palmer died in 1899 and was buried in South Rockhampton Cemetery.

References

External links
 
 

1842 births
1899 deaths
Members of the Queensland Legislative Assembly
19th-century Australian politicians